Megaloceros (from Greek:   +  , literally "Great Horn"; see also Lister (1987)) is an extinct genus of deer whose members lived throughout Eurasia from the early Pleistocene to the beginning of the Holocene and were important herbivores during the Ice Ages. The type and only certain member of the genus, Megaloceros giganteus, vernacularly known as the "Irish elk" or "giant elk", is also the best known. Fallow deer are thought to be their closest living relatives.

Biology 
Most members of the genus were extremely large animals that favoured meadows or open woodlands. They are the most cursorial deer known, with most species averaging slightly below  at the withers.

Despite its name, the Irish elk was neither restricted to Ireland nor closely related to either species commonly referred to as elk (Alces alces in British English and other European languages; Cervus canadensis in North American English) but instead is closely related to the fallow deer genus Dama. The genus was part of a Late Neogene Eurasian radiation of fallow deer relatives of which today only two taxa remain.(Lister et al. 2005, Hughes et al. 2006).

Although sometimes synonymized with Megaloceros, Praemegaceros, Sinomegaceros and Megaceroides are apparently generically distinct. M. savini and related taxa (novocarthaginiensis and matritensis) are split into the separate genus Praedama by some scholars.

Species 
Ordered from oldest to youngest:

M. stavropolensis
Early Pleistocene species from Southwestern Russia. Has subsequently been suggested to belong to Arvernoceros instead.
M. luochuanensis
Early to Mid-Pleistocene species in the Shaanxi Loess of China, alternatively considered a species of Sinomegaceros.
M. novocarthaginiensis
 Described from the latest Early Pleistocene 0.9-0.8 Ma of Cueva Victoria in Spain. Known from antlers, teeth and postcranial material. Related and possibly ancestral to M. savini
M. antecedens
Very similar to M. giganteus, to the point where it is often regarded as a paleosubspecies of the latter. The antlers were more compact, and the tines near the base large and palmate.  Lived in Mid-Pleistocene Germany
M. savini
Mid-Pleistocene species, slightly larger than a caribou, first fossils found near Sainte Savine, France and near Soria, Spain. Its antlers were straight, with thorn-like prongs. The lowermost prongs near the base were palmate. Has been suggested to comprise the separate genus Praedama.
M. matritensis
Mid-Pleistocene species, lived around 300-400 ka near present-day Madrid, Spain, being contemporary with M. giganteus. The species had enlarged premolars, very thick molar enamel, and a low mandibular condyle. The species itself formed part of the diet of people which lived in the area. M. matritensis fossils are found associated to stone tools of late Acheulean and early Mousterian type. The species is thought to be descended from M. savini
M. giganteus
Lived throughout Eurasia, from Ireland to China during the last ice age.
Megaceroides algericus
From the Late Pleistocene to Holocene of North Africa has been considered to be closely related and possibly derived from Megaloceros.

References

Further reading 

  (2006): 
  (1987): Megaceros or Megaloceros? The nomenclature of the giant deer. Quaternary Newsletter 52: 14–16.
  (2005):

External links

Cervinae
Prehistoric deer
Prehistoric even-toed ungulate genera
Pleistocene even-toed ungulates
Pleistocene genus extinctions
Pleistocene first appearances
Pleistocene mammals of Asia
Pleistocene mammals of Europe
Fossil taxa described in 1828